Kunihiro Shimizu (清水邦広 Shimizu Kunihiro, born August 11, 1986) is a Japanese volleyball player who plays for Panasonic Panthers. He announced retirement from the national team after finishing seventh place in 2020 Summer Olympics. Shimizu was crowned the Most Valuable Player in Asian Championship 2015.

Personal life
Kunihiro Shimizu is left-handed.

Kunihiro Shimizu was married to Japanese singer Mika Nakashima in 2014 and they got divorced in 2018.

Kunihiro Shimizu remarried in 2021. His first daughter was born on 3 September, 2022.

Clubs
  Fukui University Fukui Junior and Senior High School
  Tokai University
  Panasonic Panthers (2009–)

Awards

Individuals
 2009: 58th Kurowashi Tournament – MVP, Best 6
 2009: World Grand Champions Cup – Best Scorer
 2009: 2009/10 V.Premier League – MVP, Best Spike, Best 6
 2010 Kurowashiki Tournament Best6
 2010-2011 Men's V.Premier League - Best 6
 2011-2012 Men's V.Premier League - Best 6
 2013-14 Men's V.Premier League MVP, Best 6
 2014: 63rd Kurowashi Tournament – Most Valuable Player
 2015: Asian Championship – Most Valuable Player
 2015-2016 Men's V.Premier League Fighting Spirit Award, Best 6

Team
 2009 Kurowashiki All Japan Volleyball Championship -  Champion, with Panasonic Panthers.
 2009-2010 V.Premier League -  Champion, with Panasonic Panthers.
 2010 Kurowashiki All Japan Volleyball Championship -  Champion, with Panasonic Panthers.
 2011-2012 V.Premier League -  Champion, with Panasonic Panthers.
 2012 Kurowashiki All Japan Volleyball Championship -  Champion, with Panasonic Panthers.
 2012-2013 V.Premier League -  Runner-Up, with Panasonic Panthers.
 2013 Kurowashiki All Japan Volleyball Championship -  Runner-Up, with Panasonic Panthers.
 2013-2014 V.Premier League -  Champion, with Panasonic Panthers.
 2014 Kurowashiki All Japan Volleyball Championship -  Champion, with Panasonic Panthers.

National team

Senior Team
 2007: World Cup – 9th place
 2007: World League – 13th place
 2008: Summer Olympics – 11th place
 2008: World League – 6th place
 2009: World League – 15th place
 2009: Asian Championship –  Gold Medal
 2009: World Grand Champions Cup –  Bronze Medal
 2010: Asian Games –   Gold Medal
 2011: World League – 15th place
 2011: World Cup – 10th place
 2012: World League – 15th place
 2013: Asian Championship – 4th place
 2013: World League – 18th place
 2014: World League – 19th place
 2014: Asian Games –   Silver Medal
 2015: Asian Championship –  Gold Medal
 2015: World Cup — 6th place
 2015: World League — 13th place (tied)
 2016: World League — 24th place
 2019: Nations League — 10th place
 2019: World Cup — 4th place
 2019: Asian Championship —  Bronze Medal
 2021: Nations League — 11th place
 2021: Summer Olympics — 7th place

Personal life
Shimizu married Mika Nakashima who is a Japanese singer on 25 December 2014. On February 2, 2018, Nakashima announced that she and Shimizu will be divorcing. The decision was mutual as they both agreed they don't see each other enough and it be best to divorce. They both agreed their time together was irreplaceable. There is no hard feelings and they will remain friends and will continue to support each other and chase their dreams.

In January 2022, he remarried TV Osaka reporter, Nana Sakamoto, who is 7 years younger.

References

External links
 
 
 
 バレー元日本代表主将・清水邦広、再婚相手は「一緒にいて居心地がいい」という女子アナ。良きパートナーを得て“伝道師”として邁進 at Yahoo! Japan

1986 births
Japanese men's volleyball players
Living people
Opposite hitters
Sportspeople from Fukui Prefecture
Tokai University alumni
People from Western Tokyo
Olympic volleyball players of Japan
Volleyball players at the 2008 Summer Olympics
Asian Games medalists in volleyball
Volleyball players at the 2010 Asian Games
Volleyball players at the 2014 Asian Games
Asian Games gold medalists for Japan
Asian Games silver medalists for Japan
Medalists at the 2010 Asian Games
Medalists at the 2014 Asian Games
Volleyball players at the 2020 Summer Olympics